Miloslav Bělonožník (11 July 1918 – 12 January 2010) was a Czech ski jumper. He competed in the individual event at the 1948 Winter Olympics.

References

External links
 

1918 births
2010 deaths
Czech male ski jumpers
Olympic ski jumpers of Czechoslovakia
Ski jumpers at the 1948 Winter Olympics
People from Vysoké nad Jizerou
Sportspeople from the Liberec Region